Filzmoos is a town within the district of St. Johann im Pongau in the state of Salzburg, Austria. Its main income comes through tourism: skiing in winter and hiking in summer. The town is approximately 1 km above sea level.

Location 

Filzmoos sits below the Gosaukamm mountain range, with the nearest major peak being the Bischofsmütze (Bishop's Mitre), so named due to the shape of its double summit.  The mountain itself is a popular objective for climbers. Northeast of the town is the Dachstein massif.

Gallery

Notable people 
 Brigitte Totschnig, former Austrian alpine skier, was born in the town.
 Michaela Kirchgasser, former world slalom skiing silver medalist grew up in Filzmoos and still lives there.

References

External links
Filzmoos website (summer)
Filzmoos website (winter)

Cities and towns in St. Johann im Pongau District
Ski areas and resorts in Austria